Licking Township is one of the twenty-five townships of Muskingum County, Ohio, United States.  The 2000 census found 2,248 people in the township.

Geography
Located on the western edge of the county, it borders the following townships:
Jackson Township - north
Cass Township - northeast
Muskingum Township - east
Falls Township - southeast
Hopewell Township - south
Hopewell Township, Licking County - southwest corner
Hanover Township, Licking County - west
Perry Township, Licking County - northwest corner

No municipalities are located in Licking Township, although the unincorporated community of Nashport lies in the western part of the township.

Name and history
Statewide, the only other Licking Township is located in Licking County.

Licking Township was organized before 1806. By the 1830s, Licking Township contained two churches, four mills, and two of the largest ancient mounds in the county.

Government
The township is governed by a three-member board of trustees, who are elected in November of odd-numbered years to a four-year term beginning on the following January 1. Two are elected in the year after the presidential election and one is elected in the year before it. There is also an elected township fiscal officer, who serves a four-year term beginning on April 1 of the year after the election, which is held in November of the year before the presidential election. Vacancies in the fiscal officership or on the board of trustees are filled by the remaining trustees.

Emergency services
The township has a strictly volunteer Fire and EMS department.  The Licking Township Firehouse houses both departments and is located at 6705 Dillon Hills Dr.  The property where the facility is located was donated by Tony Laymen(sp).  A large portion of the labor needed to build the facility was donated by the members and families of the Fire and EMS crews.

References

External links
County website
Misc Info

Townships in Muskingum County, Ohio
Townships in Ohio